Lewis Parker may refer to:

Lewis Parker (artist) (1926–2011), Canadian artist and children's book illustrator
Lewis Parker (politician) (1928–2011), American politician of the Virginia House of Delegates, 1972–1993
Lewis Parker (musician) (born 1977), British hip-hop artist

See also
Lew Parker (1910–1972), American actor
Louis N. Parker, English dramatist, composer and translator